Wingate Institute, officially Orde Wingate Institute for Physical Education and Sports, is a sports training institute located south of Netanya, Israel.

History

Wingate Institute was established in 1957. It was named after Orde Wingate. It serves as the host facility for several Israeli national sports teams and as a base for IDF fitness training. Among  its numerous athletic fields is the rugby pitch that serves as the home pitch of the Israel national rugby union team. Additionally, numerous fields are used as venues during the Maccabiah Games.

In 1989, the institute was awarded the Israel Prize, for sport.

Schools  

 Nat Holman School for Coaches and Trainers
 Ribstein Centre for Research, Sports Medicine and Physiotherapy
 International Jewish Sports Hall of Fame
 Turner Pedagogical Centre
 Cultivation of Young Talent in the Sport-Gifted Centre
Centre for the Development of Sports Achievement
Headquarters for the Israeli Diving Federation

Notable alumni

Girmaw Amare (born 1987), runner
Gideon Ariel (born 1939), Olympic competitor in the shot put and discus throw
Mohamed Abu Arisha (born 1997), basketball player for Hapoel Be'er Sheva of the Israeli Basketball Premier League and the Israeli national basketball team
Shani Bloch (born 1979), Olympic racing cyclist
Maya Calé-Benzoor (born 1958), Olympic runner and long jumper
 Jon Dalzell, American-Israeli basketball player
 Adam Edelman (born 1991), American-born four-time Israeli National Champion in skeleton event, and Israeli Olympian
Jonathan Erlich (born 1977), tennis player, ranked # 5 in world in doubles
 Yuval Freilich (born 1995), épée fencer, 2019 European Epee Champion
 Julia Glushko (born 1990), tennis player
 Anastasia Gorbenko (born 2003), Olympic swimmer, won the gold medal in the girls' 200 m individual medley at the 2018 Youth Olympic Games. 
Gilad Hesseg, singer-songwriter
Hussniya Jabara (born 1958), politician
Maya Kalle-Bentzur (born 1958), Olympic runner and long jumper
Nili Natkho (1982-2004), basketball player
Tomer Or (born 1978), Olympic fencer & junior world champion
Orna Ostfeld (born 1952), basketball player (scored world record 108 points) & coach
Nina Pekerman (born 1977), triathlete
Andy Ram (born 1980), tennis player, ranked # 5 in world in doubles
Idit Silman (born 1980), Knesset member
Derrick Sharp (born 1971), basketball player
 Miriam Siderenski (born 1941), Olympic sprinter
 John Whitman (born 1967), author and krav maga instructor
Eyal Yanilov (born 1959), Krav Maga instructor

See also 
Sports in Israel
Education in Israel
List of Israel Prize recipients
National Sport Center – Tel Aviv
Wingate test

References

External links

 

 
1957 establishments in Israel
Educational institutions established in 1957
Organizations based in Netanya
Sports organizations of Israel
Educational organizations based in Israel
Military installations of Israel
National Institutes of Sport
Israel Prize in sport recipients
Israel Prize recipients that are organizations
Sport in Netanya
Lacrosse venues
Rugby union stadiums in Israel